Sara Shagufta (31 October 1954 – 4 June 1984) was a Pakistani poet who wrote poetry in Urdu and Punjabi language. She died by suicide in Karachi.

Life
Sara was born on 31 October, 1954 in Gujranwala, Pakistan in a lower-class family. Her family had migrated to Karachi from Punjab during the partition of India in 1960s. Her father had remarried, so her mother was responsible for her and her siblings’ upbringing. Her mother supported the family through home-based work such as making flower garlands. Sara’s letters give an insight on the difficulties she and her family faced growing up in a household with an absent father. They faced economic hardship, which escalated as far as the family going hungry. Belonging to a poor and uneducated family, she wanted to rise socially but could not pass her matriculation.

She was forcibly married at the age of 17 and had a child with her husband, that died as a newborn. The blame for the baby's death was directed towards Sara, which led to her divorce from her husband.  This was followed by three other unsuccessful marriages.

An abusive relationship with her father, emotionally and sexually abused in her childhood, divorced by four men, shunned by her children and outcast by society, Sara Shagufta led a life littered with suffering. She developed mental illnesses as a result of the challenges she faced. She was admitted to a mental hospital due to her illness. After a non-fatal suicide attempt, she died by suicide at an early age of 29 on 4 June 1984, around 11 PM.

Works
Her collections of poetry was published posthumously as Aankhein and Neend Ka Rang by Saeed Ahmed, a person she was in love with. Asad Alvi translated her poetry into English and published as The Colour of Sleep and Other Poems (2016). English translations of her poems 'Woman and Salt', 'To Daughter, Sheely' and 'The Moon is Quite Alone' appear in We Sinful Women by Rukhsana Ahmad.

Legacy
Indian author Amrita Pritam, also a close friend of Sara, wrote two books based on the life and works of Sara; Ek Thi Sara (There was a Sara) (1990) and Life and Poetry of Sara Shagufta (1994). Main Sara (Me, Sara), a play written by Shahid Anwar, is based on the life of Sara. Sara Ka Sara Aasman, another play written by Danish Iqbal and directed by Tarique Hameed, is also based on the life of Sara. Based on Amrita Pritam's books on Sara, the play was presented by Wings Cultural Society at All India Radio's Urdu Theatre Festival in 2015.

Further reading

See also
 List of Urdu Poets

References

1954 births
1984 deaths
Punjabi people
Urdu-language poets from Pakistan
Pakistani women writers
Suicides in Pakistan
Suicides by train
1984 suicides